The 2018–19 Irish Super League season was the 46th running of Basketball Ireland's premier men's basketball competition. The season began featuring 12 teams from across the Republic of Ireland and Northern Ireland, before dropping to 11 mid-season following Swords Thunder disbanding in February 2019. The regular season began on 29 September 2018 and ended on 24 March 2019 with Tralee Warriors claiming their maiden championship. Killester were victorious in the National Cup, while Templeogue won the Champions Trophy for the first time after finishing as runners-up in three out of the previous four seasons.

Teams

League

Standings

Results

Champions Trophy

Bracket

Quarter-finals

Semi-finals

Final

Source: Basketball Ireland

National Cup

Round 1

Round 2

Semi-finals

Final

Source: Basketball Ireland

Awards

Player of the Month

Coach of the Month

Statistics leaders
Stats as of the end of the regular season

Regular season
 Player of the Year: Jason Killeen (Templeogue)
 Young Player of the Year: CJ Fulton (Belfast Star)
 Coach of the Year: Pat Price (Tralee Warriors)
 All-Star First Team:
 Paul Dick (Tralee Warriors)
 Mike Davis (Belfast Star)
 Sean Sellers (Maree)
 Mike Bonaparte (DCU Saints)
 Jason Killeen (Templeogue)
 All-Star Second Team:
 Ciaran Roe (Killester)
 Royce Williams (Killester)
 Lorcan Murphy (Templeogue)
 Eoin Quigley (Tralee Warriors)
 Niels Bunschoten (Maree)
 All-Star Third Team:
 Elijah Mays (UCD Marian)
 Neil Randolph (Templeogue)
 Kieran Donaghy (Tralee Warriors)
 Luis Filiberto Garcia Hoyos (Killester)
 Martins Provizors (DCU Saints)

References

External links
Basketball Ireland

Irish
Super League (Ireland) seasons
Basket
Basket